Andrea Antonelli (17 January 1988 – 21 July 2013) was an Italian motorcycle racer. He was killed in an accident at the Moscow Raceway, whilst competing for Team Go Eleven Kawasaki in the Supersport World Championship.

Career
Antonelli, born in Castiglione del Lago, Italy, first raced in the Italian 125cc Championship, becoming the second youngest ever race winner behind Marco Melandri. He then moved onto the European Superstock 600 Championship in 2005, becoming runner up to Maxime Berger in 2007. He next stepped up to the Superstock 1000 Championship with the Lorini Honda team, where he spent four seasons, peaking with 4th overall in 2010. He and Lorini moved into the Supersport World Championship for 2012, but left the team to join Bike Service Yamaha midseason, finishing the season 10th overall, and moved again to Team Go Eleven Kawasaki for 2013. Both he and the team took their best ever results early in the season, including a fourth-place finish at Motorland Aragón, and a fourth place start at Moscow Raceway.

Death
Antonelli died in a crash on 21 July 2013 at the Moscow Raceway during a 2013 Supersport World Championship season race. He fell on the back straight in the rain and was hit by fellow Italian Lorenzo Zanetti's Honda. He suffered head trauma and later succumbed to his injuries. As a result of the accident, the remaining races of the weekend were cancelled.

Career statistics

Supersport World Championship

Races by year

References

1988 births
2013 deaths
People from Castiglione del Lago
Italian motorcycle racers
Motorcycle racers who died while racing
Filmed deaths in motorsport
Sport deaths in Russia
FIM Superstock 1000 Cup riders
Supersport World Championship riders
Sportspeople from the Province of Perugia